Aparshakti Khurana (born 18 November 1987) is an Indian actor, radio jockey, comedian, singer, music director, television host and a former Indian cricketer who was the captain of Haryana U-19 Cricket Team. He is the younger brother of actor Ayushmann Khurrana.

Khurrana's first Bollywood project came with the sports biopic Dangal (2016), which emerged as the highest-grossing Indian film of all time and earned him several recognitions. He subsequently played many supporting roles in several other commercially successful films such as Badrinath Ki Dulhania (2017), Stree (2018), Luka Chuppi (2019) and Pati Patni Aur Woh (2019). In 2021, he acted in Helmet, his first film as a solo lead.

Early and personal life
Khurrana was born on 18 November 1987 in Chandigarh. His father P. Khurrana is an astrologer and an author on the subject of astrology, whereas his mother Poonam is a house wife of half-Burmese descent and an M.A. in Hindi. He completed his schooling and graduation in law from Chandigarh. He was also into sports at school and captained the Haryana U-19 cricket team. He completed his higher education in the field of Mass Communication from IIMC Delhi. He is also the younger brother of Bollywood actor Ayushmann Khurrana.

He married Aakriti Ahuja, a businesswoman and an ISB graduate (whom he met at a dance class in Chandigarh) on 7 September 2014. In June 2021, the couple announced that they were expecting their first child. The couple became parents to a baby girl on 27 August 2021, Arzoie A Khurana.

Career
Aparshakti auditioned for MTV Roadies (Season 3, Episode 2). It was the first time, he faced the camera.

Debut and breakthrough (2016–18)
Khurana made his acting debut with Nitesh Tiwari's biographical sports drama Dangal (2016) which is the real story of Mahavir Singh Phogat. He is an Indian amateur Pehlwani wrestler, who trains his two daughters Geeta and Babita to become India's world class top-female wrestlers. Aamir Khan was cast as Mahavir, while Fatima Sana Shaikh and Sanya Malhotra featured as the two daughters, and Khurana played Omkar, Mahavir's nephew. The film garnered favorable reactions from critics and was highly anticipated.

The Shashank Khaitan directed-romantic comedy Badrinath Ki Dulhania (2017) was Khurana's next film release. Co-starring Alia Bhatt and Varun Dhawan, the film narrated the story of an independent young woman (Bhatt) from rural India who refuses to conform to patriarchal expectations from her chauvinistic fiancé (Dhawan). Khurana was cast as Bhushan Mishra, Bhatt's brother-in-law. Badrinath Ki Dulhania proved to be one of the top-grossing productions of the year, grossing over  worldwide.

In 2018, Khurana appeared in three films, the first of which was Mudassar Aziz's Happy Phirr Bhag Jayegi (a sequel to the 2016 film Happy Bhag Jayegi), a comedy about two girls who both are named Happy. A critical and commercial failure, it co-starred Sonakshi Sinha and Diana Penty, with Khurana playing the supporting part of Aman Wadhwa, the eloped fiancé of Happy 2 (Sinha). His next role was in Amar Kaushik's directorial debut Stree, a horror comedy co-starring Rajkummar Rao, Shraddha Kapoor, and Pankaj Tripathi. Khurana's final release of 2018 was the Netflix film Rajma Chawal. Directed by Leena Yadav, it starred Rishi Kapoor, Anirudh Talwar and Amyra Dastur, and was poorly received.

Further supporting roles (2019–present)
Khurana took on another supporting role in Laxman Utekar's 2019 romantic comedy Luka Chuppi, co-starring Kartik Aaryan, Kriti Sanon and Tripathi. Set in Uttar Pradesh, 'Luka Chupi' is about the story of a live-in-relationship between a headstrong woman (Rashmi, played by Kriti Sanon) and a television reporter (Guddu, played by Kartik Aaryan). His next film of the year was debutante Prashant Singh's Jabariya Jodi, starring Sidharth Malhotra and Parineeti Chopra, which deals with the prevalence of groom kidnapping in Bihar. After doing a special appearance in his brother Ayushmann's commercially successful satire Bala directed by Kaushik, he played Aaryan's best friend in his last film of 2019, the comedy-drama Pati, Patni Aur Woh directed by Aziz, a remake of the 1978 film with the same name, which relates the life of a philandering husband who gets attractive towards his female co-worker. While Luka Chuppi, Bala and Pati Patni Aur Woh were commercially successful, Jabariya Jodi performed poorly at the box office.

Khurana next starred in Remo D'Souza's dance film Street Dancer 3D, a spin-off to the 2015 dance film ABCD 2, starring Dhawan and Shraddha Kapoor, which was released on 24 January 2020. His first lead role came in the comedy film Helmet which premiered on ZEE5. Khurana stars in Hum Do Hamare Do with Rajkummar Rao and Kriti Sanon, released on 29 October 2021 on Disney+ Hotstar.

Filmography

Films

Television

Web series

Music videos

Discography

Awards and nominations

References

External links
 
 

Living people
Indian male film actors
Indian male television actors
Male actors from Chandigarh
Indian television presenters
Indian radio presenters
Screen Awards winners
21st-century Indian male actors
1987 births